Thierry Fidjeu Tazemeta (born 13 October 1982) is a Cameroonian former professional footballer who played as a striker. Although he played for the Equatorial Guinea national team, he was later found ineligible by the Confederation of African Football.

International career
Fidjeu was born in Douala, Cameroon. He debuted for Equatorial Guinea in a friendly match against Chad on 8 February 2011. He represented the nation at the 2012 Africa Cup of Nations, of which it was co-host with neighbouring Gabon.

He took part in Equatorial Guinea's first round victory against Mauritania in qualification for the 2015 Africa Cup of Nations, but was later found ineligible to represent Equatorial Guinea by the Confederation of African Football, resulting in the country's expulsion from the qualification campaign.

References

External links

Svhorn 

Soccerterminal.com
superlignews.com

1982 births
Living people
Footballers from Douala
Cameroonian footballers
Association football forwards
Union Douala players
Xewkija Tigers F.C. players
SV Horn players
SC Schwanenstadt players
SK Austria Kärnten players
Maccabi Netanya F.C. players
Diyarbakırspor footballers
Konyaspor footballers
Thierry Fidjeu
Saint-Colomban Sportive Locminé players
Valletta F.C. players
Austrian Football Bundesliga players
Süper Lig players
Israeli Premier League players
Cameroon under-20 international footballers
Cameroonian expatriate footballers
Cameroonian expatriate sportspeople in Malta
Expatriate footballers in Malta
Cameroonian expatriate sportspeople in Austria
Expatriate footballers in Austria
Cameroonian expatriate sportspeople in Israel
Expatriate footballers in Israel
Cameroonian expatriate sportspeople in Thailand
Expatriate footballers in Thailand
Cameroonian expatriate sportspeople in Turkey
Expatriate footballers in Turkey
Equatorial Guinea international footballers
2012 Africa Cup of Nations players